Ahmed Bahusayn (born 9 February 2001) is a Saudi professional footballer who plays as a midfielder for Hajer.

Career
Bahusayn started at Al-Ittihad's youth team and was promoted to the first team during the 2020–21 season. On 16 April 2021, Bahusayn made his professional debut for Al-Ittihad against Al-Batin in the Pro League, replacing Abdulaziz Al-Jebreen. On 20 July 2021, Bahusayn signed his professional contract with the club. On 26 January 2023, Bahusayn joined First Division League side Hajer.

References

External links
 

2001 births
Living people
Saudi Arabian footballers
Saudi Arabia youth international footballers
Association football midfielders
Saudi Professional League players
Saudi First Division League players
Ittihad FC players
Hajer FC players